Edgar Fabián Espíndola (born 4 May 1985) is an Argentine footballer who plays as a forward.

Club career

Early career
Espíndola started his career in 2005 with Argentine giants Boca Juniors. He played six games for the club, but Boca failed to win any of them. However, he was a member of the Boca Juniors squad that captured the 2005 Copa Sudamericana. In 2006, he was offloaded to Talleres. He then had spells with Ecuadorian teams Aucas and Deportivo Quito before joining Real Salt Lake.

Major League Soccer 
He was acquired by Real Salt Lake at the same time as fellow Argentines Matias Mantilla and Javier Morales. He scored his first goal against Kansas City Wizards, and celebrated this goal by doing his customary backflip. Six minutes into a game against Los Angeles Galaxy on 6 September 2008, Espíndola scored a goal that was later ruled offside. However, before he had seen the final decision on the goal he had commenced his celebratory backflip, which resulted in him injuring his ankle, ruling him out for around eight weeks. Real Salt Lake decided not to purchase Espíndola's contract and he was released in January 2009. He then signed to play for Venezuelan team Deportivo Anzoátegui, scoring 3 goals in 5 matches for the club. On 29 January 2009 Espíndola scored Deportivo Anzoátegui's first ever goal in the Copa Libertadores helping the club to a 2–0 victory over Deportivo Cuenca.

Espíndola returned to Salt Lake in April 2009 and helped them win the MLS Cup in November 2009. In 2011 Espíndola had his most productive season for Salt Lake as he scored a career high 10 goals in 27 matches. In February 2012, Espíndola signed a four-year contract extension with Real Salt Lake. During the 2012 season Espíndola continued his fine form as he scored 9 goals and provided 7 assists in 30 matches.

On 3 December 2012, Espíndola was traded with Jamison Olave to New York Red Bulls in exchange for allocation money. On 3 March 2013 Espíndola made his debut for New York scoring twice in a 3–3 draw at Portland Timbers. On 27 July 2013 Espíndola converted on a pair of penalty kicks to help New York to a 4–3 victory over his former club Real Salt Lake.

On 18 December 2013, Espíndola joined D.C. United in the second stage of the 2013 MLS Re-Entry Draft He was known to be a usual starter for DC. On 20 July 2016, D.C. United traded Espíndola to Vancouver Whitecaps FC for allocation money. He finished at D.C. United with 59 games played, 20 goals scored, and 17 goals assisted.

Necaxa
Espíndola was sold by the Whitecaps (without having played a game for them) to recently-promoted Liga MX side Necaxa on 26 July 2016.

Albacete
On 8 August 2017, Espíndola signed a one-year contract with Spanish Segunda División club Albacete Balompié.

Personal life
A report in The Washington Post on D.C. United roster statuses in November 2014 did not include Espíndola as a player using an international roster slot. It is believed that he received a U.S. green card during the 2014 season.

On 27 March 2017, former D.C. United goalkeeper Charlie Horton sued Espíndola, coach Ben Olsen, and Major League Soccer. Espíndola allegedly assaulted Horton during practice and Horton received a concussion. The filing states that, "due to the severity of his ongoing post-concussive neurological symptoms, which directly inhibited his ability to perform at a level necessary to continue his professional career, Mr. Horton was forced to officially retire from professional soccer." Olsen is being sued for failing to adequately supervise Espíndola. MLS is liable, the suit says, because, in its centralized business structure, the league owns all teams and player contracts. Horton dismissed the lawsuit in late 2019.

Career statistics

Honours
Boca Juniors
 Copa Sudamericana: 2005

Real Salt Lake
 MLS Cup: 2009

New York Red Bulls
 MLS Supporters' Shield: 2013

References

External links

Statistics at Guardian Stats Centre

1985 births
Living people
Footballers from Buenos Aires
Association football forwards
Argentine footballers
Argentine expatriate footballers
Boca Juniors footballers
Talleres de Córdoba footballers
S.D. Quito footballers
Real Salt Lake players
Deportivo Anzoátegui players
New York Red Bulls players
S.D. Aucas footballers
D.C. United players
Vancouver Whitecaps FC players
Club Necaxa footballers
Albacete Balompié players
San Martín de Tucumán footballers
Expatriate footballers in Mexico
Expatriate footballers in Ecuador
Expatriate footballers in Venezuela
Expatriate footballers in Spain
Expatriate soccer players in the United States
Argentine expatriate sportspeople in the United States
Argentine expatriate sportspeople in Spain
Argentine Primera División players
Primera Nacional players
Major League Soccer players
Major League Soccer All-Stars
Designated Players (MLS)
Liga MX players
Segunda División players